Mihran Poghosyan (born 29 May 1976) is an Armenian businessman and civil servant and currently deputy of the Republican Party of Armenia. He was Major-General of Justice and Chief Compulsory Enforcement Officer since June 2008, until he resigned in April 2016, following revelations in the Panama Papers. 

The SIS had launched a criminal investigation shortly after Poghosyan’s resignation. The Special Investigation Service (SIS) of Armenia said on January 24, 2017 that it will not press criminal charges against Major General of Justice.

Poghosyan was born in Yerevan on 29 May 1976. He studied Economics at Yerevan State University from 1993-1998 and Law at the International University in Moscow from 2004-2006 and holds a PhD in Economics.

The title "Honorary Professor" was conferred on him by the Scientific Council of the Law Institute of the Ministry of Justice of Armenia.

He was the youngest citizen of Armenia to be awarded the Major General honour (outside of periods of war).

In April 2017, Poghosyan was elected a deputy of the National Assembly of the RA by the territorial electoral list of the RPA, from the first electoral district. 

In 2019, Poghosyan founded a construction company in the Russian Federation. 

He is married to Karineh Mkhitaryan, and they have three children.

References

External link

1976 births
Businesspeople from Yerevan
Living people
Politicians from Yerevan
Yerevan State University alumni
People named in the Panama Papers